The Terontola–Foligno railway is an electrified, standard-gauge Italian railway that connects the Florence–Rome railway in  with the Rome–Ancona railway in , passing through  and .

History 

The railway was inaugurated in December 1866 as an integral section of the Florence–Foligno line, which was later merged with the Rome–Ancona railway, thus making journeys between Florence and Rome possible; this became more important after the conquest of Rome by Italy in 1870.
 
In 1875, with the opening of the Terontola–Chiusi section, which shortened the Florence–Rome route by several tens of kilometres, all the trains between these two destinations were diverted to the new railway; as a result the Terontola–Foligno was relegated to the role of secondary railway.
 
Starting in 1960, the railway underwent numerous modernisations: it was electrified, the equipment was replaced and the main station squares were rebuilt. However, the branch to Tavernelle (Panicale), which connected to the line at Ellera-Corciano station was closed due to low traffic.
 
Electric operations on the line commenced at the timetable change of May 1960.
 
Over time, the line has continued to play the role of connecting the Florence–Rome and the Rome–Ancona lines, frequented mostly by regional trains of various compositions and railcars of the Ferrovia Centrale Umbra, as well as by trains running directly between Perugia and Rome via . Travel times for the whole line range from 60 to 90 minutes. Doubling of the line was planned in 2011.

Route
The Terontola–Foligno line can be divided into three sections.
 
The first section, about 25 kilometers long, winds from the junction with the Florence-Rome to the exit from Ellera-Corciano station and is characterised by long straights and very wide curves. It begins in the Tuscan territory with a two-kilometre straight from Terontola station and, after a couple of short tunnels, turns south-east reaching Tuoro station; it continues alongside Lake Trasimeno, following its profile and passing by Montecolognola with the longest tunnel of the line, about 1.3 km long, and reaching Magione; it then runs to Ellera, including a long stretch on an embankment.
 
The second section, of about 18 km, starts from Ellera and continues to Ponte San Giovanni; it has the steepest grades of the line (around 1.0%) and the narrowest curves (although the curve radiuses are never less than 500 metres). There are also four tunnels and a masonry viaduct with five spans in the San Vetturino area. The railway winds around the Umbrian capital in a sinuous "S", shaped path, called the ansa di Perugia ("loop of Perugia"), which significantly extends travel times.
 
In this first part of the line, the main structures are a masonry bridge over the Tiber, immediately after Ponte San Giovanni station, a deep cutting in Collestrada, a metal bridge over the Chiascio and a masonry bridge over the Topino. Two stations on this last section of the line (Ospedalicchio and Cannara) have been closed due to a lack of traffic: the first has been disused since 1980, while the second closed in 1995. The facilities of the two stations still exist, but trains have not stopped there for some time.

References

Footnotes

Sources

External links

Railway lines in Umbria
Railway lines in Tuscany
Railway lines opened in 1866
1866 establishments in Italy